The UEFS Futsal European Women's Championships or Eurofutsal was the championship for futsal national teams in Europe. It was first held in 2001 and played every 3 years until 2007, and every 2 years since then. The tournament was organized by the European Union of Futsal.

Summaries

Performance by members

Medal count

Participation details 

Legend
 – Champions
 – Runners-up
 – Third place
 – Fourth place
5th-6th — Fifth to Sixth place
Q — Qualified for upcoming tournament
 — Qualified but withdrew
 — Did not qualify
 — Did not enter / Withdrew from the European Championship / Banned
DSQ — Disqualified
 — Hosts

References

 
Women's international futsal competitions
European championships
Futsal competitions in Europe
Women's sports competitions in Europe